The 2008–09 Tunisian Ligue Professionnelle 1 was the 83rd season of top-tier football in Tunisia. It began on 8 August 2008 and concluded on 13 May 2009. The competition saw the return of two previous participants, Avenir Sportif de Kasserine and Espoir Sportif de Hammam-Sousse from Ligue Professionnelle 2. Espérance de Tunis won the championship while previous year's winnersClub Africain finished in second place.

Clubs and venues

Results

League table

Result table

Leaders

External links
2008–09 Ligue 1 on RSSSF.com

Tun
Tunisian Ligue Professionnelle 1 seasons
1